Heart Break is the seventh studio album by American country pop trio Lady Antebellum. It was released on June 9, 2017, through Capitol Records Nashville. The album serves as the "spiritual follow-up" to 2010's Need You Now and is their first release since 2014's 747, with its three-year gap being the longest between two albums by the group to date. 

Heart Break was supported by two singles: The first single "You Look Good" was released in January 2017 as the record's lead single and has since become the group's thirteenth top 10 single on the Hot Country Songs chart. The second single "Heart Break" was released in September 2017. The album debuted at number four on the US Billboard 200 chart, earning 53,000 album-equivalent units in its first week.

Background
In 2015, Lady Antebellum began experiencing declining success with the singles released from their sixth studio album, 747 (2014), which the band attributes to a "fatigue" amongst fans and radio programmers. After the completion of their accompanying Wheels Up Tour, the group announced a short hiatus from both recording and touring. During this time, the members all worked on individual projects – Charles Kelley and Hillary Scott on their solo debuts The Driver and Love Remains, respectively, and Dave Haywood on the production of Post Monroe's debut EP. When the group returned to work on their next album, they spent a month in Los Angeles, California and recruited pop producer busbee to oversee the project. The album was written and recorded primarily in Florida and California, due to the group feeling creatively stifled in Nashville.

Singles
"You Look Good" was released to digital retailers on January 19, 2017, as the album's first single. The song impacted American country radio on January 23. "You Look Good" scored a "hot shot debut" of number 27 on the Country Airplay chart dated February 4, 2017, and has since peaked within the top 20. The song entered the Hot Country Songs chart at number 41. Following the group's performance of the single at the 2016 ACM Awards on April 2, 2017, "You Look Good" rose twelve positions to number 9 (on the chart dated April 22, 2017). This earned Lady Antebellum their thirteenth top 10 hit on that chart, and first since "Bartender" in 2014. The song rose to number 8 on the Hot Country Songs chart (on the chart dated July 1, 2017). On the chart dated July 15, 2017, "You Look Good" rose into the top 10 of the Country Airplay chart. It has since peaked at number 4.

The title track, "Heart Break", was released as a digital promotional single on May 12, 2017. It was released to American country radio stations on September 25, 2017, as the second official single.

Promotional singles
The second promotional single, "Somebody Else's Heart", was released on May 19, 2017.

The third promotional single, "This City", was released on May 26, 2017.

The fourth promotional single, "Hurt", was released on June 2, 2017.

Accolades

Commercial performance
Heart Break debuted at number four on the US Billboard 200 chart, earning 53,000 album-equivalent units (including 47,000 copies as pure album sales) in its first week. This became Lady Antebellum's eighth US top-ten debut. The album also debuted at number one on the US Top Country Albums chart, becoming the group's fifth number one on the chart. As of December 2018, the album has sold 170,200 copies in the United States.

Track listing

Personnel
Adapted from AllMusic.

Lady Antebellum
Dave Haywood – banjo, bouzouki, acoustic guitar, electric guitar, mandolin, background vocals
Charles Kelley – lead vocals, background vocals, acoustic guitar
Hillary Scott – lead vocals, background vocals

Additional musicians

Eric Barvinder – viola
Charlie Bisharat – violin
Jacob Braun – cello
busbee – bass guitar, Hammond B-3 organ, mellotron, piano, synthesizer, background vocals
Paul Bushnell – bass guitar
David Campbell – string arrangements
Matt Chamberlain – cymbals, drums, percussion
Paul Franklin – pedal steel guitar
Jesse Frasure – synthesizer
Jon Green – keyboards, percussion, background vocals
Sara Haze – background vocals
Sean Hurley – bass guitar, background vocals
Songa Lee – violin
Russ Pahl – pedal steel guitar
Garrett Parales – electric guitar
Jordan Reynolds – piano
Michelle Richards – violin
Justin Schipper – Dobro
Aaron Sterling – drums, percussion, tom-toms, background vocals
Mark Trussell – acoustic guitar, electric guitar, synthesizer
Nick Vayenas – trombone, trumpet
Josefina Vergara – violin
Will Weatherly – synthesizer, background vocals
Emily Weisband – background vocals
Derek Wells – banjo, dobro, electronic mandolin, electric guitar, mandolin, background vocals 
Ben West – synthesizer

Production and artwork

Adam Ayan – mastering
Sean R. Badum – assistant engineer
busbee – engineer, producer, programming
Matt Chamberlin – programming
Dave Clauss – digital editing, programming
Callie Cunningham – art direction
Eric Ray Davis – photography 
John Edwards – assistant engineer
Jesse Frasure – programming
Douglas Gledhill – design, layout
Dave Haywood – art direction
Charles Kelley – art direction
Ryan McCann – design, layout
Daniel Miller – art direction
Justin Niebank – mixing
Charlie Paakkari – engineer
Justin Schipper – engineer
Hillary Scott – art direction
Melissa Spillman – production assistant
Mark Trussell – engineer
Nick Vayenas – engineer
Will Weatherly – programming
Brian David Willis – digital editing

Charts

Weekly charts

Year-end charts

References

2017 albums
Albums produced by busbee
Capitol Records Nashville albums
Lady A albums